Risley is a small village and parish in Erewash in the English county of Derbyshire. The population of the civil parish as of the 2011 census was 711. It is just over four miles south of Ilkeston. Sandiacre is adjacent to the east.

It is almost midway between Derby and Nottingham and is near junction 25 of the M1 motorway, and the A52. In 1870 it had a population of 203 when there was a grammar school that served seven neighbouring parishes.

History
All Saints' Church was built in Elizabethan times by members of the Willoughby family, who had acquired Risley in 1350 AD and who also founded a free school in the village. Risley is a long thin village with most properties lying on either side of the main road. With the village hall standing on one side of the church and the school on the other, this is the closest one can get to the village "centre". The church belongs to the Stanton group of churches with Dale Abbey and Stanton by Dale. The village pub is the Risley Park formerly the Blue Ball on Derby Road

Risley Manor originally belonged to the Mortimers. It passed to the Sheffields and then the Willoughbys and, in 1870, it belonged to J. L. Ffytche. The manor was held by Sir Hugh Willoughby, the navigator, who sailed on 10 May 1553, with three ships, in search of the North-east passage, but was frozen to death with all his crew in the following January. It is now a country house hotel.

A silver vessel known as the Risley Park Lanx, 20 inches by 15, said to have belonged to a church in France in 405, was found near the Hall in 1729.

Sport

Cricket
Risley Cricket Club has a history of activity dating back to 1872. The club's ground and pavilion is 200m up the track, off the Derby Road, behind Treetops Hospice. The club has two senior teams that compete in the Derbyshire County Cricket League and a long-established junior training section that play competitive cricket in the Erewash Young Cricketers League.

Golf
Maywood Golf Club opened in 1990 as a 9-hole course, and was then extended to an 18-hole course in 1992. The 72-par course closed permanently on 31 March 2019.

Notable residents
 Sir Hugh Willoughby, the navigator, owned the manor here.
 Teresa Hooley, poet, was born here in 1888.

See also
Listed buildings in Risley, Derbyshire

References

External links

 Risley Parish Council

Villages in Derbyshire
Civil parishes in Derbyshire
Borough of Erewash